Romiit Raaj is an Indian actor who started his career in 2002 and has done lead roles on television serials, web series and films.

Television

References

External links

Year of birth missing (living people)
Living people
Male actors from Mumbai
Indian male television actors
Male actors in Hindi television